The concept of coalition-proof Nash equilibrium applies to certain  "noncooperative" environments in which players can freely discuss their strategies but cannot make binding commitments.
It emphasizes the immunization to deviations that are self-enforcing. While the best-response property in Nash equilibrium is necessary for self-enforceability, it is not generally sufficient  when players can jointly deviate in a way that is mutually beneficial.

The Strong Nash equilibrium  is criticized as too "strong" in that the environment allows for unlimited private communication. In the coalition-proof Nash equilibrium the private communication is limited.

Formal definition.
(i) In a single player, single stage  game  ,   is  a Perfectly  Coalition-Proof  Nash equilibrium if  and  only  if    maximizes  .
(ii) Let (n,t) ≠ (1,1).
(a) For  any  game    with    players  and    stages,    is perfectly self-enforcing if, for all J in J (set of all coalitions),  sJ* is a Perfectly Coalition-Proof Nash equilibrium in the game Γ/s*−J, and if the restriction of s* to any proper subgame forms a Perfectly Coalition-Proof Nash equilibrium in that subgame. 
(b) For any game Γ with n players and t stages,    is a Perfectly Coalition-Proof Nash equilibrium if it is perfectly self-enforcing, and if there does not exist another perfectly self-enforcing strategy vector s in S such that g1(s)>  g1(s*)  for all  i= 1,...,n.

Less formal:
At first all players are in a room deliberating their strategies. Then one by one, they leave the room fixing their strategy and only those left are allowed to change their strategies, both individually and together.

The coalition-proof Nash equilibrium refines the Nash equilibrium by adopting a stronger notion of self-enforceability that allows multilateral deviations.

Parallel to the idea of correlated equilibrium as an extension to Nash equilibrium when public signalling device is allowed, coalition-proof equilibrium is defined by Diego Moreno and John Wooders.

References 

Game theory equilibrium concepts